Harke Haldar is a weekly comedy serial on Kantipur Television from one of the rural village of Nepal, where the story revolves around the main character. Hawaldar (Harke ) along with his troublesome neighbors.

Cast of Harke Haldar 
 Asha Khadka .. Ashe
 Bishnu Sapkota ... Harke Haldar and Lahure
 Indra Dong Lama ... Khambe
 Roshani Sapkota .. Batul
 Saru Dahal ... Deuti

Crew of Harke Haldar 
 Cinematography : Dipak Basnet
 Editor: Rabindra Khadka

Related links 
 Kantipur Television

References

External links
Kantipur Television

Nepalese television series
Kantipur Television series
Television shows set in Nepal
2010s Nepalese television series